List of beaches of South Africa, A beach is a geological landform along the shoreline of a body of water. It usually consists of loose particles which are often composed of rock, such as sand, gravel, shingle, pebbles, or cobblestones. The particles of which the beach is composed can sometimes instead have biological origins, such as shell fragments or coralline algae fragments.

List of beaches of South Africa

See also
 List of beaches

South Africa
Beaches
Beaches